Douglas Armstrong (born September 24, 1964) is a Canadian professional ice hockey executive, currently the general manager for the St. Louis Blues of the National Hockey League (NHL). He is also a former general manager of the NHL's Dallas Stars.

Front office career

Dallas Stars
Armstrong joined the Minnesota North Stars organization for the 1990–91 season, and remained with the team when they relocated to Dallas to become the Dallas Stars in 1993, eventually being appointed general manager on January 25, 2002. He won the Stanley Cup as an assistant general manager with the Stars in 1999. Armstrong replaced Bob Gainey as GM of the Stars with 32 games to go in the 2001–02 NHL season, and one of his first moves was hiring Dave Tippett as head coach. Armstrong is the son of NHL Hall of Fame linesman Neil Armstrong, inducted in 1991.

On November 13, 2007, in the wake of a 7–7–3 start and a colossal meltdown by the team away against the Los Angeles Kings (losing 6–5 in overtime after leading 4–0 with seven minutes remaining in the game), Armstrong was fired as GM and replaced by former Stars player Brett Hull and assistant GM Les Jackson as interim co-general managers. During Armstrong's tenure, the Stars went 210–109–35–23 in the regular season, representing a .634 winning percentage, which is best in Stars history for a General Manager. Some important moves Armstrong made during his time as GM included the drafting of players like Trevor Daley, James Neal, Loui Eriksson and Jamie Benn. He also made a trade for Mike Ribeiro in exchange for defenceman Janne Niinimaa, which turned out to be beneficial for Dallas' offence.

St. Louis Blues

On May 29, 2008, the St. Louis Blues announced they had named Armstrong as the club’s director of player personnel after signing him to a two-year contract. When the two years were up, Armstrong became the club’s general manager after Larry Pleau’s retirement.

On June 17, 2010, the Blues acquired goaltender Jaroslav Halak from the Montreal Canadiens in exchange for prospects Lars Eller and Ian Schultz. Although he had yet to officially take over duties as GM, this was considered to be Armstrong’s first big move as the GM of the Blues.

In 2013, Armstrong was named the NHL General Manager of the Year and runner up again in 2019.

In his ongoing tenure with the Blues, Armstrong has acquired many marquee players (whether by trade, free agency or the NHL Draft), including Martin Brodeur, Ryan O'Reilly, Vladimir Tarasenko, Jaden Schwartz, Alex Pietrangelo, Jay Bouwmeester, Paul Stastny and Ryan Miller.

In 2018-19, Armstrong's Blues would surge up the standings for a third-place finish in the Central Division before eventually defeating the Boston Bruins in seven games to win their first Stanley Cup championship in franchise history.

In Armstrong's twelve seasons as General Manager with St. Louis, the Blues have won three Central Division Regular Season titles (2011–12, 2014–15, 2019–20) and reached the Stanley Cup Playoffs ten times, Divisional Finals five times, Conference Finals twice and won the Stanley Cup in 2019.

On February 15, 2022, Armstrong earned his 500th win as the Blues general manager (710th as NHL General Manager) becoming only the 25th GM in NHL history to achieve such with a single franchise.

International
Armstrong has been part of Hockey Canada's management group for the gold medal-winning teams in the 2010 and 2014 Winter Olympics; 2007 and 2016 Gold Medal World Championship Teams, 2016 World Cup Championship Winning Team plus the Silver Medal Winning Teams in the 2008 and 2009 World Championship. After winning the Stanley Cup in 2019 with the St. Louis Blues Armstrong became the 1st person in management to become part of the Double Triple Gold Club ( Winning Stanley Cup in 1999 and 2019, Olympics in 2010 and 2014 plus World Championship in 2007 and 2016). He also served on Canada's 2002 World Championship Team (did not medal). On February 3, 2021, it was announced that Armstrong would be the general manager for team Canada’s 2022 Olympic team.

References

1964 births
Living people
Canadian people of Scottish descent
Dallas Stars executives
National Hockey League general managers
Sportspeople from Sarnia
St. Louis Blues executives
Stanley Cup champions
Minnesota North Stars executives